Charles II, also known as Charles the Lame (1254 – 5 May 1309), was King of Naples, Count of Provence and Forcalquier (1285–1309), Prince of Achaea (1285–1289), and Count of Anjou and Maine (1285–1290); he also styled himself King of Albania and claimed the Kingdom of Jerusalem from 1285. He was the son of Charles I of Anjouone of the most powerful European monarchs in the second half of the 13th centuryand Beatrice of Provence. His father granted Charles the Principality of Salerno in the Kingdom of Sicily (or Regno) in 1272 and made him regent in Provence and Forcalquier in 1279.

After the uprising known as the Sicilian Vespers against Charles's father, the island of Sicily became an independent kingdom under the rule of Peter III of Aragon in 1282. A year later, his father made Charles regent in the mainland territories of the Regno (or the Kingdom of Naples). Charles held a general assembly where unpopular taxes were abolished and the liberties of the noblemen and clerics were confirmed. He could not prevent the Aragonese from occupying Calabria and the islands in the Gulf of Naples. The Sicilian admiral, Roger of Lauria, captured him in a naval battle near Naples in 1284. As he was still in prison when his father died on 7 January 1285, his realms were ruled by regents.

Early life

Born in 1254, Charles was the son of Charles I of Anjou and Beatrice of Provence. He was the sole heir of his father's vast dominion. By the time of Charles's birth, his father had seized Provence and Forcalquier (in the Holy Roman Empire), Anjou and Maine (in France), and the Kingdom of Sicily (a fief of the Holy See). In the 1270s, his father also proclaimed himself King of Albania (in reference to his conquests along the Eastern coast of the Ionian Sea), partially asserted his claim to the Kingdom of Jerusalem, and inherited Achaea (in the Peloponnese). Charles's mother died in 1267, but his father's determination to keep his empire intact deprived Charles of his maternal inheritance during his father's lifetime.

Charles I arranged a double marriage alliance with Stephen V of Hungary in 1269. Stephen's daughter, Maria was engaged to Charles, and Charles's sister, Isabelle to Maria's brother, Ladislaus. Charles fell seriously ill in late 1271. To encourage prayers for his recovery, his father donated Charles's wax sculptures to churches frequented by pilgrims in the whole kingdom. After Charles recovered, his father made a pilgrimage at the shrine of Saint Nicholas in Bari and sent gifts to the sanctuary of Mary the Virgin at Rocamadour.

Charles was knighted together with his brother, Philip, and 100 Italian and French young noblemen at Pentecost 1272. On this occasion, his father also granted him the Principality of Salerno, which had customarily been held by the heirs apparent during the reign of the Norman kings of Sicily. The king stipulated that Charles could not claim other territories, most probably in reference to Provence.

Regent

His father appointed him to administer Provence in late 1279. He accompanied his cousin, Philip III of France, to a meeting with Peter III of Aragon at Toulouse in December 1280. Peter was the son-in-law of Manfred of Sicily who had lost the Kingdom of Sicily to Charles's father in 1266. Peter insolently ignored Charles during the meeting, although both Philip III and James II of Majorca, who was also present, reminded Peter that Charles was closely related to him.

The envoys of Charles's father with the representatives of Rudolf I of Germany and the Holy See started negotiations about the restoration of the Kingdom of Arles in 1278. They reached a compromise, that Pope Martin IV included in a papal bull on 24 May 1281. The bull prescribed that the kingdom, which should include the Dauphiné, Savoy and the nearby territories, was to be given to Charles's son, Charles Martel, on the day of his marriage with Rudolf's daughter, Clemence. Charles was appointed regent for his minor son.

Heavy taxation, forced loans and purveyance caused widespread discontent among Charles I's Italian subjects, especially in the island of Sicily. A French soldier's arrogance caused a popular riotknown as the Sicilian Vespersin Palermo on 30 March 1282. The riot quickly spread and put an end to Charles I's rule in the island. Peter III of Aragon came to Sicily accompanied by a large fleet in late August. He was proclaimed king on 4 September.

Charles I and Peter III agreed that a judicial duel should decide their conflict. Before leaving for France in January 1283, Charles I appointed Charles and Charles's cousin, Robert II, Count of Artois, co-regents. He authorized them to take measures, after consulting with the papal legate, Gerard of Parma, to prevent the spread of the rebellion to the mainland territories. Charles and his troops left Reggio Calabria and marched as far as San Martino di Taurianovaan easily defensible townon 13 February 1283. After his departure, Peter III captured Reggio Calabria.

Charles held a general assembly for the barons, prelates and the envoys of the towns at his camp near San Martino. The royal monopoly of salt and the practise of regular exchange of small coins was abolished. The assembly also decided that the monarchs could levy the most unpopular tax, the subventio generalis, only after consulting with the representatives of their subjects. The liberties of the noblemen and the clergy were confirmed and the commoners' obligations to contribute to the maintenance of royal fortresses and the flee were reduced. The reforms adopted at the assembly made the continuation of his father's active foreign policy impossible.

Charles strengthened the position of native aristocracy, appointing members of the Aquinas, Ruffo and Sanseverino families to the royal council. He also tried to make his father's most unpopular officials scapegoats for the abuses. In June 1283, he ordered the imprisonment of all male members of the della Marre and Rufouli families, who had been responsible for the collection of taxes and custom duties. The heads of the families were executed and their relatives were to pay huge ransoms.

Charles did not have funds to finance a lengthy war. He had to borrow thousands of ounces of gold from the Holy See, the kings of France and England, the ruler of Tunis and Tuscan bankers, and from the towns of the Regno. Gerard of Parma also persuaded the Southern Italian prelates to cede a part of their revenues to Charles for the war against the rebels and their supporters. He could then equip 40 new galleys in Provence. The Aragonese fleet had meanwhile imposed a blockade on the island of Malta. Charles dispatched his new fleet to the island, but the Sicilian admiral, Roger of Lauria, attacked and almost annihilated the Provençal galleys before they reached Malta. Lauria soon occupied the islands of Capri and Ischia, which enabled him to make frequent raids against the Bay of Naples. After he also captured Nisida, he imposed a blockade on Naples.

Captivity

The inhabitants of Naples urged Charles to expel the Aragonese garrison from Nisida. Although his father had forbidden him to attack the Aragonese until his arrival, Charles decided to invade the islet. Believing that most Aragonese ships had left the Bay of Naples, he sailed for Nisida on 5 June 1284, but the Aragonese galleys soon surrounded and defeated his fleet. During the battle, Charles fell into captivity. He was first taken to Messina where the crowd demanded his execution in revenge for Conradin (Manfred of Sicily's young nephew, who had been beheaded at Charles I's order in 1268). To save Charles's life, Constance of SicilyPeter III of Aragon's wifeimprisoned him at the fortress of Cefalù.

Charles I died on 7 January 1285. On his deathbed, he had made Robert of Artois regent for the minor Charles Martel who would rule as vicar general until Charles was released from captivity. The Provençal delegates held a general assembly at Sisteron and decided to do their utmost to secure Charles's release. Pope Martin IV partially ignored Charles I's last will. He did not acknowledge the right either of the captive Charles or of his minor son to rule, claiming that an interregnum followed the king's death. The pope confirmed Artois' regency, but he made Cardinal Gerald co-regent, authorizing them to administer the kingdom on behalf of the Holy See. The regents appointed the most powerful ruler of the Peloponnese, William I de la Roche, Duke of Athens, bailiff of Achaea to secure the local lords' loyalty. Odo Poilechienwho had been made baillif during Charles I's reigncontinued to rule Acre which was the only town to acknowledge Charles's rule in the Kingdom of Jerusalem.

Pope Martin died on 29 March 1285. The crusade that he had declared against Aragon started in late May, but Peter III's resistance forced the crusaders to withdraw in September. At Peter's order, Charles was moved from Cefalù to Catalonia. Peter died on 10 November; his eldest sons, Alfonso III and James succeeded him in Aragon and Sicily, respectively. Henry II of Cyprus, who was regarded the lawful king of Jerusalem by most local lords, forced Odo Poilechien to leave Acre in June 1286. Since the Knights Templar and Hospitallers supported Henry, their estates were confiscated in the Regno.

Charles's sons sent a letter to Edward I of England, asking him to intervene to secure their father's release. Edward accepted their offer and mediated a fourteen-month truce in July 1286. James entered into negotiations with Charles about the conditions of Charles's release. Charles was ready to renounce the island of Sicily and Calabria in favor of James for at least the rest of his own lifetime, but Pope Honorius IV sharply opposed this plan. After Honorius died on 3 April 1287, Edward I mediated a compromise, which was completed in the presence of the delegates of the College of Cardinals in Oloron-Sainte-Marie in July. However, Philip IV of France refused to sign it, because it did not arrange for the compensation of his younger brother, Charles of Valois, who had laid claim to Aragon.

The new pope, Nicholas IV, who was enthroned in February 1288, also disapproved the treaty, but allowed Edward I to continue the negotiations. A new agreement, repeating most terms of the previous compromise, was signed at Canfranc in October. According to the treaty, Charles was to be released for a ransom of 50,000 marks of silver, but he also had to promise to mediate a reconciliation between Aragon, France and the Holy See. He pledged that he would send his three sonsCharles Martel, Louis and Robertand 60 Provençal noblemen as hostages to Aragon to secure the fulfilment of his promise. He also promised that he would return to Aragon if he could not persuade his allies to make peace with Aragon in three years. After Edward I gave further guarantees, Alfonso III released Charles who went to Paris to start negotiations with Philip IV. Philip again repudiated the treaty and Charles left France for Italy to meet with the pope.

Reign

Start of his reign

Pope Nicholas IV crowned Charles king in Rieti on Whit Sunday 1289. To persuade Charles to continue the war for Sicily, the pope granted the tenth of Church revenues from Southern Italy to him. The pope also absolved Charles from the promises that he had made to secure his release. Edward I of England protested against the pope's decision and continued to mediate between Charles and Alfonso III of Aragon. At Edward's request, Alfonso III released Charles Martel in exchange for Charles's fifth son, Raymond Berengar.

Influenced by Bartolomeo da Capua and his other advisors, Charles adopted a concept about the establishment of a purely Christian kingdom. He ordered the expulsion of the Jews and Lombards from Anjou and Maine, accusing them of usury. Applying the blood libel against the Jews of Southern Italy, he forced many of them to convert to Christianity. He also introduced the Inquisition in the Regno.

Alfonso III invaded Charles's realm and laid siege to Gaeta, because he thought that the burghers were ready to rise up against Charles, but the town resisted. Charles Martel and Robert of Artois led troops to the town and surrounded the besiegers. Edward I of England sent envoys to Charles, urging him to respect the treaty of Canfranc. The pope dispatched two cardinals to prevent the reconciliation, but Charles and Alfonse signed a two-year truce. To secure stability in Achaea, Charles decided to restore a line of local rulers in the principality. He arranged a marriage for Isabella of Villehardouinthe daughter of the last native prince, William IIwith a successful military commander, Florent of Hainaut. In September, he granted Achaea to them, but he kept his right to suzerainty over the principality and also stipulated that if Florent predeceased her, Isabella could not remarry without his consent.

Negotiations

Charles left Southern Italy to start new negotiations with Philip IV. Before visiting Paris, he went to the Aragonese frontier to offer himself for imprisonment on 1 November in accordance with the treaty of Canfranc, but nobody came to arrest him. Charles and Philip IV signed a treaty at Senlis on 19 May 1290. Charles gave his daughter, Margaret, in marriage to Charles of Valois, giving Anjou and Maine to him as her dowry in return for his promise to abandon his claim to Aragon with the pope's consent. Philip IV also promised that he would make peace with Aragon as soon as Alfonso III and the Holy See were reconciled.

The envoys of all parties, but James of Sicily, started negotiations with the mediation of English delegates at Perpignan, and continued them in Tarascon in late 1290 and early 1291. They reached a compromise which was included in a treaty in Brignoles on 19 February 1291. The document confirmed most terms of the treaty of Senlis and restored the peace between Alfonso III, Philip IV and Charles. Charles received the districts of Avignon held by the French monarch. The Holy See also accepted the terms of the treaty because Alfonso of Aragon promised that he would lead a crusade against the Mamluks of Egypt.

The treaty of Brignoles deprived Alfonso's brother, James of Sicily, of Aragonese support, but Alfonso unexpectedly died on 18 June. James succeeded Alfonso in Aragon, but he did not want to cede the island of Sicily and Calabria to Charles and made his younger brother, Frederick, his lieutenant. The Mamluks occupied the last strongholds in the Kingdom of Jerusalem in the summer of 1291. Pope Nicholas IV called for a new crusade and urged the Christian "kings, princes and prelates" to send their proposals about the recovery of the Holy Land. Charles was the only monarch to answer the pope. He suggested that the sole grand master of the united military orders, who should be appointed from about the royal princes, was to rule the reconquered Kingdom of Jerusalem.

After realizing that his new subjects would not support a war for Sicily, James sent envoys to Rome to start negotiations about his submission shortly before Pope Nicholas died on 4 April 1292. Charles was also willing to reach a compromise, because he wanted to secure Hungary for his family. Charles's brother-in-law, Ladislaus IV of Hungary, had been murdered on 10 July 1290. The Hungarian noblemen elected Ladislaus' cousin, Andrew III, king, although Andrew's legitimacy was doubtful. Charles's wife regarded herself Ladislaus' lawful heir. Claiming that Hungary was the fief of the Holy See, Pope Nicholas IV granted Hungary to her son, Charles Martel, in 1292. The most powerful noblemen in Croatia and Slavoniatwo realms ruled by the kings of Hungaryaccepted the pope's decision. Charles made donations to them to secure their support, but Charles Martel could never assert his claim.

The death of Pope Nicholas IV gave rise to a prolonged interregnum. Charles continued the negotiations with James with the mediation of Sancho IV of Castile. An agreement was completed in Figueras in late 1293. James agreed to give up Sicily in return for a compensation. To put an end to the interregnum in Rome, Charles persuaded the cardinals to elect Peter of Morronea hermit who had been known for his apocalyptic visionspope. Being grateful to Charles, Pope Celestine V granted him Church revenues from France, the Holy Roman Empire and England to finance a new military campaign against Sicily. After Celestine abdicated in December 1294, the cardinals elected Benedetto Caetani pope. Pope Boniface VIII was determined to put an end to the war, because he wanted to declare a new crusade for the reconquest of the Holy Land.

Peace

Pope Boniface VIII confirmed the compromise between James and Charles in Anagni on 12 June 1295. However, the Sicilians refused the Treaty of Anagni and James of Aragon's brother, Frederick, was crowned king of Sicily on 12 December 1295. Frederick soon made a raid against Basilicata.

An attempt was made to bribe Frederick into consenting to this arrangement, but being backed up by his people he refused, and was afterwards crowned King of Sicily. The ensuing war was fought on land and sea, but Charles, though aided by the Pope, his cousin Charles of Valois and James, was unable to conquer the island, and his son the prince of Taranto was taken prisoner at the Battle of La Falconara in 1299. Peace was at last made in 1302 at Caltabellotta. Charles gave up all rights to Sicily and agreed to the marriage of his daughter Eleanor and King Frederick; the treaty was ratified by the Pope in 1303. Charles spent his last years quietly in Naples, which city he improved and embellished.

He died in Naples in May 1309, and was succeeded by his son Robert the Wise, with his eldest grandson Charles I of Hungary excluded from Neapolitan succession.

Family

In 1270, he married Maria of Hungary ( – 25 March 1323), the daughter of Stephen V of Hungary and Elizabeth the Cuman. They had fourteen children:
 Charles Martel of Anjou (1271-1295), titular King of Hungary, predeceased his father.
 Margaret (1272– 31 December 1299), Countess of Anjou and Maine, married at Corbeil 16 August 1290 to Charles of Valois
 Saint Louis of Toulouse (9 February 1274, Nocera Inferiore – 19 August 1298, Chateau de Brignoles), Bishop of Toulouse
 Robert the Wise  (1276-1343), King of Naples
 Philip I of Taranto (1278-1331/2), Prince of Achaea and Taranto, Despot of Romania, titular Emperor of Constantinople and titular King of Albania
 Blanche of Anjou (1280 – 14 October 1310, Barcelona), married at Villebertran 1 November 1295 James II of Aragon
 Raymond Berengar (1281–1307), Count of Provence, Prince of Piedmont and Andria
 John (1283 – aft. 16 March 1308), a priest
 Tristan (1284–bef. 1288)
 Eleanor of Anjou, (August 1289 – 9 August 1341, Monastery of St. Nicholas, Arene, Elis), married at Messina 17 May 1302 Frederick III of Sicily
 Maria of Naples (1290 – ), married at Palma de Majorca 20 September 1304 Sancho I of Majorca, married 1326 Jaime de Ejerica (1298 – April 1335)
 Peter (1291 – 29 August 1315, Battle of Montecatini), Count of Gravina
 John of Durazzo (1294 – 5 April 1336, Naples), Duke of Durazzo, Prince of Achaea, and Count of Gravina, married March 1318 (div 1321) Matilda of Hainaut (29 November 1293–1336), married 14 November 1321 Agnes of Périgord (d. 1345)
 Beatrice (1295 – ), married April 1305 Azzo VIII d'Este, marchese of Ferrara etc. (d. 1308); she married secondly 1309 Bertrand III of Baux, Count of Andria (d. 1351)

Ancestry

References

Sources

External links

 Armorial of the House Anjou-Sicily 

|-

|-

|-

|-

1254 births
1309 deaths
13th-century monarchs of Naples
14th-century monarchs of Naples
House of Anjou-Naples
Monarchs of Naples
Albanian monarchs
Claimant Kings of Jerusalem
Princes of Achaea
Counts of Anjou
Princes of Salerno
Counts of Provence
Charles I of Anjou
Royalty and nobility with disabilities
Sons of kings